ORF 2 Europe is a free-to-air version of the Austrian TV channel ORF 2. The service differs from the Austrian version in that some programs are replaced with a video simulcast of Ö1 International, ORF's international radio service. It has been broadcast across Europe since July 2004.

External links 
 ORF 2 TV Listings (ORF 2 Europe broadcasts labelled)

Television stations in Austria
Television channels and stations established in 2004
2004 establishments in Austria
International broadcasters
ORF (broadcaster)